Grégoire Burquier and Alexandre Sidorenko were the defending champions, but only Sidorenko chose to defend his title partnering Axel Michon. Sidorenko lost to Ivan and Matej Sabanov in the first round.

Rameez Junaid and Andreas Siljeström won the title after defeating James Cerretani and Antal van der Duim 5–7, 7–6(7–4), [10–8] in the final.

Seeds

Draw

References
 Main Draw

Open Harmonie mutuelle - Doubles
Saint-Brieuc Challenger